We Demand a Referendum Now (WDARN) was a British political party launched by independent Member of the European Parliament (MEP) Nikki Sinclaire in June 2012 following her departure from the UK Independence Party (UKIP). It was a single-issue party that sought to force a referendum on British membership of the European Union (EU).

We Demand a Referendum Now was registered with the Electoral Commission in June 2012 by Nikki Sinclaire. The party held its inaugural conference on 5 October 2012.

The party ran a slate of candidates in the West Midlands European Parliament constituency for the 2014 European Parliament elections. It had originally announced plans to stand candidates in every British region. The party received 1.7% of the vote in the West Midlands, and did not win any seats.

We Demand a Referendum aimed to "go beyond party politics" and "do everything within [its] power to enable a referendum". Its leadership accused the EU of being protectionist and called for the creation of a Royal Commission to look into the costs and benefits of EU membership for the United Kingdom.

European Parliament

References

External links 
 Let The People Decide (party website)
 We Demand A Referendum (blog website)

 
Political parties established in 2012
2012 establishments in the United Kingdom
UK Independence Party breakaway groups
2014 disestablishments in the United Kingdom
Political parties disestablished in 2014
Defunct political parties in England
Single-issue political parties in United Kingdom